Kwangch'ŏn station is a railway station in Kwangch'ŏn-dong, greater Tanch'ŏn city, South Hamgyŏng province, North Korea, on the Kŭmgol Line of the Korean State Railway. It was opened on 30 March 1943 along with the rest of the Yŏhaejin–Tongam section of the line; the station was originally called Yongjam station (Chosōn'gŭl: 용잠역; Hanja: 龍岑驛), receiving its current name after the establishment of the DPRK.

References

Railway stations in North Korea